Kaialiʻi Kahele (born March 28, 1974) is an American politician, educator, and commercial pilot who served as the U.S. representative for Hawaii's 2nd congressional district from 2021 to 2023. From 2016 to 2020, he served in the Hawaii Senate from the 1st district. Kahele is a member of the Democratic Party and the son of the late Hawaii Senate member Gil Kahele.

In January 2019, Kahele announced he would challenge Tulsi Gabbard in Hawaii's 2nd congressional district in 2020, but Gabbard dropped out of the race to focus on her campaign for the Democratic presidential nomination. Kahele won the congressional nomination on August 8, 2020. He won the general election and became the second Native Hawaiian to serve as a member of Congress representing Hawaii since statehood, after Daniel Akaka.

After one term in Congress, Kahele ran for governor in 2022. He was defeated in the Democratic primary by Lieutenant Governor Josh Green.

Early life and education
Kahele is a Native Hawaiian whose family comes from the small fishing village of Miloliʻi in South Kona, where he was born on March 28, 1974. He is the son of Linda Haggberg ​and Gil Kahele. He graduated from Hilo High School and attended Hawaiʻi Community College and the University of Hawaiʻi at Hilo before earning a Bachelor of Arts in education from the University of Hawaiʻi at Mānoa in 1998.

Career

Military service

Kahele is a military and civilian pilot. He is a commissioned officer in the Hawaii Air National Guard, where he continues to serve as a lieutenant colonel with the 201st Air Mobility Operations Squadron at Hickam Air Force Base. Kahele is a decorated combat veteran with multiple deployments to both Iraq and Afghanistan since 2005. He flew 108 combat sorties, logged 3,075 hours of military flight time, and commanded C-17 combat missions. Kahele has received numerous awards, including the Meritorious Service Medal, the Commendation Medal, the Air Medal for combat missions flown in Afghanistan, the National Defense Service Medal, the Global War on Terrorism Service Medal, Armed Forces Reserve Medal, Hawaii State Active Duty Medal and the Combat Readiness Medal. He has been named both Pacific Air Forces Guard Officer of the Year and Hawaiʻi Air National Guard Officer of the Year.

Kahele also flies as a civilian pilot for Hawaiian Airlines, and has served as an adjunct faculty member at the University of Hawaiʻi at Hilo.

Hawaii State Senate
Kahele was appointed to the 1st district of the Hawaii Senate on February 16, 2016, after the death of his father, Gil Kahele. Kahele defeated Dennis "Fresh" Onishi in the August 2016 Democratic primary, 57% to 35%, and Libertarian Kimberly Arianoff in the November general election. He won the 2018 general election by a wide margin.

In 2019, Kahele was selected to serve as the Majority Floor Leader in the Senate and as chairman of the Senate Committee on Water and Land. He was a member of the Ways and Means, Hawaiian Affairs and Higher Education committees. During the 19th Annual Western Legislative Academy (WLA), lawmakers from other states elected Kahele as the class president of the Council of State Governments (CSG) West. He represented the WLA and all alumni as an executive committee member of CSG West.

Kahele has vowed to reform the University of Hawaiʻi System, declaring that the "system is broken". He introduced SB 1161 in 2017 to freeze tuition until 2027. The bill did not advance. Kahele introduced SB 2329 in 2018 calling for reduction in tuition at UH campuses. The bill has been criticized for reducing the university's ability to manage its finances.

Kahele backed passage and enactment of a measure establishing the Hilo Community Economic Division to pave the way for County and State investment in Hilo and East Hawaii's economic future. He was a key supporter in developing a bachelor of science in commercial aviation program that will commence in the fall of 2019 at the University of Hawaiʻi at Hilo. Other legislative priorities for Kahele were Banyan Drive redevelopment and funding for rat lungworm disease research. HB 2014 for $1M in research funding related to rat lungworm disease at UH Hilo was introduced in the Hawaii House but has not advanced.

In 2017, Kahele served as Vice Chair of the Education Committee, Chair of the Higher Education Committee, and member of Housing and Ways and Means Committees.

On December 16, 2020, Kahele resigned from the Hawaii Senate in preparation to assume office in the United States House of Representatives.

U.S. House of Representatives

Elections

2020

Incumbent Representative Tulsi Gabbard, who had run for president, stated on October 25 that she would not run for another term in Congress. Kahele won the primary election on August 8, 2020, and went on to win the general election by over 30 points.

Tenure
Kahele voted in favor of impeaching Trump for a second time following the 2021 storming of the United States Capitol. In his first floor speech in Congress, he spoke in favor of impeaching Trump, claiming Trump had violated his oath of office by inciting a “deadly insurrection”. He also said, "our sacred oaths are hollow without accountability".

From February 2022 to April 2022, he cast all 120 votes by proxy while working part-time as a commercial pilot for Hawaiian Airlines. Two weeks after this was reported, Kaheke retired from Congress to run for governor of Hawaii in the 2022 election.

Committee assignments
Committee on Armed Services
Subcommittee on Tactical Air and Land Forces
Subcommittee on Readiness
Committee on Transportation and Infrastructure
Subcommittee on Aviation
Subcommittee on Highways and Transit

Caucus memberships
Congressional Progressive Caucus
Congressional LGBTQ+ Equality Caucus

Electoral history

Personal life

As a member of the University of Hawai‘i at Mānoa's Rainbow Warriors NCAA Division I Men's volleyball team, Kahele was voted "most inspirational teammate" by his team in 1997. He and his wife live with their daughters in Hilo, his lifetime home on Hawai‘i Island.

See also

List of Asian Americans and Pacific Islands Americans in the United States Congress

References

External links

|-

|-

1974 births
21st-century American politicians
Asian-American members of the United States House of Representatives
Democratic Party Hawaii state senators
Democratic Party members of the United States House of Representatives from Hawaii
Hawaii National Guard personnel
Hawaii Rainbow Warriors volleyball players
Hawaiian Airlines people
Living people
National Guard (United States) officers
Native Hawaiian politicians
People from Hilo, Hawaii
University of Hawaiʻi at Mānoa alumni